Carl Koch may refer to:

 Carl Koch (director) (1892–1963), German film director and writer
 Carl Koch (architect) (1912–1998), American architect
 Carl Ludwig Koch (1778–1857), German entomologist and arachnologist

See also
 Karl Koch (disambiguation)